Aleuropteryginae is a subfamily of lacewing.

Genera 
 Alboconis Nel et al., 2005 † 
 Aleuropteryx Löw, 1855
 Coniocompsa Enderlein, 1905
 Conwentzia Enderlein, 1905
 Cryptoscenea Enderlein, 1914
 Helicoconis Enderlein, 1905
 Hemisemidalis Meinander, 1972 
 Heteroconis Enderlein, 1905
 Neoconis Enderlein, 1930
 Semidalis Enderlein, 1905
 Spiloconis Enderlein, 1907
 Vartiana H. Aspock & U. Aspock, 1965

References 

Coniopterygidae
Insect subfamilies